A unit prefix is a specifier or mnemonic that is prepended to units of measurement to indicate multiples or fractions of the units.  Units of various sizes are commonly formed by the use of such prefixes. The prefixes of the metric system, such as kilo and milli, represent multiplication by powers of ten.  In information technology it is common to use binary prefixes, which are based on powers of two.  Historically, many prefixes have been used or proposed by various sources, but only a narrow set has been recognised by standards organisations.

Metric prefixes

The prefixes of the metric system precede a basic unit of measure to indicate a decadic multiple and fraction of a unit. Each prefix has a unique symbol that is prepended to the unit symbol. Some of the prefixes date back to the introduction of the metric system in the 1790s, but new prefixes have been added, and some have been revised. The International Bureau of Weights and Measures has standardised twenty metric prefixes in resolutions dating from 1960 to 1991 for use with the International System of Units (SI). In addition to those listed in the everyday-use table, the SI includes standardised prefixes for 1015 (peta), 1018 (exa), 1021 (zetta), 1024 (yotta), 1027 (ronna), and 1030 (quetta); and for 10−15 (femto), 10−18 (atto), 10−21 (zepto), 10−24 (yocto), 10−27 (ronto), and 10−30 (quecto).

Although formerly in use, the SI disallows combining prefixes; the *microkilogram or *centimillimetre, for example, are not permitted.  Prefixes corresponding to powers of one thousand are usually preferred, however, units such as the hectopascal, hectare, decibel, centimetre, and centilitre, are commonly used. The unit prefixes are always considered to be part of the unit, so that, e.g., in exponentiation, 1 km2 means one square kilometre, not one thousand square metres, and 1 cm3 means one cubic centimetre, not one hundredth of a cubic metre.

In general, prefixes are used with any metric unit, but may also be used with non-metric units. Some combinations, however, are more common than others. The choice of prefixes for a given unit has often arisen by convenience of use and historical developments. Unit prefixes that are much larger or smaller than encountered in practice are seldom used, albeit valid combinations. In most contexts only a few, the most common, combinations are established. For example, prefixes for multiples greater than one thousand are rarely applied to the gram or metre.

Some prefixes used in older versions of the metric system are no longer used. The prefix "myrio-" was an alternative spelling variant for "myria-", as proposed by Thomas Young.

Binary prefixes

A binary prefix indicates multiplication by a power of two. This has prompted the use of the metric prefixes kilo, mega, and giga to also denote the powers of 1024 which is common in information technology with the unit of digital information, the byte.

Units of information are not covered in the International System of Units. Computer professionals have historically used the same spelling, pronunciation and symbols for the binary series in the description of computer memory, although the symbol for kilo is often capitalised.

In the specifications of hard disk drive capacities and network transmission bit rates, on the other hand, decimal prefixes, consistent with the metric system, are used. For example, a 500-gigabyte hard drive holds 500 billion bytes, and a 100-megabit-per-second Ethernet connection transfers data at 100 million bits per second. The ambiguity has led to some confusion and even of lawsuits from purchasers who were expecting 220 or 230 and considered themselves shortchanged by the seller. (see Orin Safier v. Western Digital Corporation and Cho v. Seagate Technology (US) Holdings, Inc.). To protect themselves, some sellers write out the full term as "".

With the aim of avoiding ambiguity the International Electrotechnical Commission (IEC) adopted new binary prefixes in 1998 (IEC 80000-13:2008 formerly subclauses 3.8 and 3.9 of IEC 60027-2:2005). Each binary prefix is formed from the first syllable of the decimal prefix with the similar value, and the syllable "bi". The symbols are the decimal symbol, always capitalised, followed by the letter "i".  According to these standards, kilo, mega, giga, et seq. should only be used in the decimal sense, even when referring to data storage capacities: kilobyte and megabyte denote one thousand and one million bytes respectively (consistent with the metric system), while terms such as kibibyte, mebibyte and gibibyte, with symbols KiB, MiB and GiB, denote 210, 220 and 230 bytes respectively.

Unofficial prefixes
A metric prefix myria-, abbreviation my-, for 10,000, was deprecated in 1960. Before the adoption of ronna- and quetta- for 1027 and 1030 and ronto- and quecto- for 10−27 and 10−30 in November 2022, many personal, and sometimes facetious, proposals for additional metric prefixes were formulated. The prefix bronto, as used in the term brontobyte, has been used to represent anything from 1015 to 1027 bytes, most often 1027. 
In 2010, an online petition sought to establish hella as the SI prefix for 1027, a movement that began on the campus of UC Davis. The prefix, which has since appeared in the San Francisco Chronicle, Daily Telegraph, Wired and some other scientific magazines, was recognised by Google, in a non-serious fashion, in May 2010. Ian Mills, president of the Consultative Committee on Units, considered the chances of official adoption to be remote. The prefix geop and term geopbyte has been used in the information technology industry to refer to 1030 bytes following brontobyte.

The ascending prefixes peta (5) and  exa (6) are based on the Greek-derived numeric prefixes penta (5) and hexa (6). The initial letters z and y, appear in the largest SI prefixes. They were changed because previously proposed ascending hepto (Greek hepta (7)) was already in use as a numerical prefix (implying seven) and the letter h as both SI-accepted non-SI unit (hour) and prefix (hecto 102), the same applied to s from previously proposed descending septo (i.e. SI unit s seconds), while o for octo was problematic since a symbol o could be confused with zero.

Before the adoption of new prefixes in 2022, several personal proposals had been made for extending the series of prefixes, with ascending terms such as xenna, weka, vendeka (from Greek ennea (9), deka (10), endeka (11)) and descending terms such as xono, weco, vundo (from Latin novem/nona (9), decem (10), undecim (11). Using Greek for ascending and Latin for descending would be consistent with established prefixes such as deca, hecto, kilo vs. deci, centi, milli). Although some of these are repeated on the internet, none are in actual use.

Use for quantities of bits and bytes

Both metric and binary prefixes are used for representing quantities of bits and bytes.

See also
 Order of magnitude
 SI base unit
 Indian numbering system

Notes

References

External links
 Moerner Lab Single-Molecule Research Page (Jokingly defines 1 guacamole = 1 / (Avocado's number) of moles. Scientific paper with reference)
 Vendeka.org Home page for the use of the non-SI prefix vendeka to represent 10 to the power of 33, as in vendekabyte.

Prefixes